Star Terk II is a BBC comedy radio show, broadcast on BBC Radio 4 in the 1980s.  Each episode began with a parody of Star Treks original series, which would go on to be interrupted by a series of sketches. Two series of six episodes were aired, in 1987 and 1989.  In the final episode, the main characters of Star Trek beam down and meet up with the actors playing them in the parody, resulting in Susie Blake interviewing herself as Uhura at one point.

External links
 

BBC Radio comedy programmes
BBC Radio 4 programmes